Valyra (3 May 2009 – 29 August 2012) was a British–bred, French-trained Thoroughbred racehorse owned by HH Aga Khan IV and trained by Jean-Claude Rouget. She won the 2012 Prix de Diane, but died in an accident later in the year.

Breeding
Valyra was the daughter of King George VI and Queen Elizabeth Stakes winner Azamour. Her dam, Valima, won the Listed Prix Imprudence and is a daughter of Poule d'Essai des Poulains winner Linamix.

Racing career
Valyra did not race as a two-year-old and made her first racecourse appearance on 14 April 2012 at Bordeaux Le Bouscat Racecourse, when she won by three quarters of a length from Glowing Cloud. She then won a conditions race at Chantilly by three lengths form O'Keefe. Valyra started the Prix de Diane as a 25/1 outsider, with Poule d'Essai des Pouliches winner Beauty Parlour starting as the 5/6 favourite. Jockey Johnny Murtagh settled Valyra near the rear of the 12-runner field in the early stages of the race. She quickened with 2 furlongs left to run and challenged the leader, Beauty Parlour, with 150 yards remaining. She took the lead with 120 yards left and ran on to win by three quarters of a length from Beauty Parlour, with Rjwa a further three lengths back in third place. On 29 August she sustained a hind leg fracture when cantering on the beach at Deauville and had to be put down. Her trainer Jean-Claude Rouget said "It is a terrible accident and a great loss for His Highness the Aga Khan and our stable. We have lost a filly with true class. She was a very sound individual and a pleasure to train." At the time she was priced at about 12/1 for the Prix de l'Arc de Triomphe.

Pedigree

See also
List of leading Thoroughbred racehorses

References

2009 racehorse births
2012 racehorse deaths
Racehorses bred in the United Kingdom
Racehorses trained in France
Undefeated racehorses
Thoroughbred family 20-d